Johns Island may refer to:

Canada
 Johns Island (Nunavut), Canada
 Johns Island (Saskatchewan), Canada

United States
 Johns Island, South Carolina, USA
 Johns Island (Washington), USA

See also
 St. John's Island (disambiguation)